Ken Flach and Kathy Jordan were the defending champions but lost in the quarterfinals to Andy Kohlberg and Patty Fendick.

Jeremy Bates and Jo Durie defeated Darren Cahill and Nicole Provis in the final, 7–6(12–10), 6–3 to win the mixed doubles tennis title at the 1987 Wimbledon Championships.

Seeds

  Ken Flach /  Kathy Jordan (quarterfinals)
 n/a
  Peter Fleming /  Betsy Nagelsen (third round)
 n/a
 n/a
 n/a
  Danie Visser /  Rosalyn Fairbank (semifinals)
  Mark Kratzmann /  Elise Burgin (first round)
  Kim Warwick /  Jenny Byrne (second round)
  Sherwood Stewart /  Anne Smith (first round)
  Gary Muller /  Anne White (second round)
  Robert Van't Hof /  Mary-Lou Piatek (first round)
  Andy Kohlberg /  Patty Fendick (semifinals)
  Michael Mortensen /  Tine Scheuer-Larsen (quarterfinals)
  John Fitzgerald /  Elizabeth Smylie (quarterfinals)
  Robert Seguso /  Carling Bassett (first round)

Draw

Finals

Top half

Section 1

Section 2

Bottom half

Section 3

Section 4

References

External links

1987 Wimbledon Championships – Doubles draws and results at the International Tennis Federation

X=Mixed Doubles
Wimbledon Championship by year – Mixed doubles